Gülyalı, formerly Abulhayır, is a town and district of Ordu Province in the Black Sea region of Turkey, 15 km east of the city of Ordu, towards Giresun. According to the 2000 census, population of the district is 10,566 of which 5,245 live in the town of Gülyalı.

Ulaş Tepe of the Republican People's Party was elected mayor in the 2019 local elections.

The villages of Gülyalı district include Yeniköy, Ambarcılı, Ayrılık, Kestane, Mustafalı, Taşlıçay, and Turnasuyu.

Notes

References

External links
 District governor's official website 
 Road map of Gülyalı and environs
 Various images of Gülyalı, Ordu

Populated places in Ordu Province
Fishing communities in Turkey
Districts of Ordu Province